Bilateral hilar lymphadenopathy is a bilateral enlargement of the lymph nodes of pulmonary hila. It is a radiographic term for the enlargement of mediastinal lymph nodes and is most commonly identified by a chest x-ray.

Causes 
The following are causes of BHL:
 Sarcoidosis
 Infection 
 Tuberculosis
 Fungal infection
 Mycoplasma
 Intestinal Lipodystrophy (Whipple's disease)
 Malignancy 
 Lymphoma
 Carcinoma
 Mediastinal tumors
 Inorganic dust disease
 Silicosis
 Berylliosis
 Extrinsic allergic alveolitis 
 Such as bird fancier's lung
Less common causes also exist: 
Eosinophilic granulomatosis with polyangiitis
Human immunodeficiency virus
Extrinsic allergic alveolitis
Adult-onset Still's disease

References

Medical signs